George Arthur "Ike" Treherne (July 15, 1884 – August 15, 1964) was a Canadian professional ice hockey center. Treherne played professionally with the New Westminster Royals in the Pacific Coast Hockey Association in 1912 and 1913.

Statistics

References

External links
George Treherne at JustSportsStats

1884 births
1964 deaths
Canadian ice hockey centres
Ice hockey people from Manitoba
New Westminster Royals players
Sportspeople from Brandon, Manitoba